George Francis Kelb (July 17, 1870 – October 20, 1936) was a pitcher in Major League Baseball. He played for the Cleveland Spiders in 1898.

References

External links

1870 births
1936 deaths
Major League Baseball pitchers
Cleveland Spiders players
Baseball players from Ohio
Sportspeople from Toledo, Ohio
19th-century baseball players
Toledo Mud Hens players
London Cockneys players
Fort Wayne Indians players
Saginaw (minor league baseball) players
Jackson White Sox players
Shreveport Giants players
Monroe Hill Citys players
Natchez Indians players
Beaumont Millionaires players
Newark Cotton Tops players